Fleischmannia harlingii is a species of flowering plant in the family Asteraceae.
It is found only in Ecuador. Its natural habitat is subtropical or tropical dry shrubland. It is a perennial herb up to 50 cm tall. It produces numerous flower heads in a branching array at the ends of the stems, each head with about 20 white disc flowers per head but no ray flowers.

The species is threatened by habitat loss.

References

harlingii
Flora of Ecuador
Vulnerable plants
Plants described in 1986
Taxonomy articles created by Polbot